The St. Louis-San Francisco Overpass is a pony and deck truss bridge built in 1937 located in Imboden, Lawrence County, Arkansas.

The bridge was listed on the National Register of Historic Places in 1990. The bridge is currently open to two-lane traffic. It has a separate pedestrian sidewalk.

See also
List of bridges documented by the Historic American Engineering Record in Arkansas
List of bridges on the National Register of Historic Places in Arkansas
National Register of Historic Places listings in Lawrence County, Arkansas

References

External links

Road bridges on the National Register of Historic Places in Arkansas
Transportation in Lawrence County, Arkansas
U.S. Route 62
Historic American Engineering Record in Arkansas
National Register of Historic Places in Lawrence County, Arkansas
Bridges of the United States Numbered Highway System
Steel bridges in the United States
Parker truss bridges in the United States